Jules Étienne Joseph Quicherat (13 October 1814 – 8 April 1882) was a French historian and archaeologist.

His father, a working cabinet-maker, came from Paray-le-Monial to Paris to support his large family; Quicherat was born there. He was fifteen years younger than his brother Louis, a great Latin scholar and lexicographer, who survived him. Although very poor, he was admitted to the College of Sainte-Barbe, where he received a thorough classical education. He showed his gratitude to this establishment by writing its history in three volumes, published between 1860 and 1864. At the end of his studies he hesitated for some time before deciding what career he would follow, until Jules Michelet put an end to his indecision by inspiring him with a taste for history.

In 1835 Quicherat entered the École des Chartes; he left two years later at the head of the college.

From the 15th century he drew other inspirations. In 1844 he published memoirs of the adventures of a brigand, Rodrigue de Villandrando, which gradually grew into a volume full of fresh matter. He wrote full biographies of two chroniclers of Louis XI, one very obscure, Jean Castel, the other, Thomas Basin, bishop of Lisieux, who was, on the contrary, a remarkable politician, prelate and chronicler. Between 1855 and 1859 Quicherat published the works of the latter, most of which were now brought out for the first time. In addition to these he wrote Fragments inédits de Georges Chastellain and Lettres, mémoires et autres documents relatifs à la guerre du bien public en 1465.

These works did not wholly occupy his time: in 1847 he inaugurated a course of archaeological lectures at the École des Chartes, and in 1849 was appointed professor of diplomatics at the same college. His teaching had exceptionally good results. Although he was not eloquent and had a nasal voice, his hearers were loath to miss any of his thoughtful teaching, which was unbiased and well expressed. Of his lectures the public saw only some articles on special subjects which were distributed in a number of reviews. Note should be made of a short treatise on  published in 1867; and a memoir  published in 1850, where he gives his theory on the use of stone arches important for the history of religious architecture.

Following the advice of his friends, he began to transcribe towards the end of his life his lectures on archaeology; but only the introductory chapters, up to the 11th century, were found among his papers. On the other hand, the pupils trained by him circulated his principles throughout France, recognizing him as the founder of national archaeology. In one point he seems to have taken a false step; with a warmth and pertinacity worthy of a better cause he maintained the identity of Caesar's Alesia with Alaise, and he died without becoming a convert to the opinion, now almost universally accepted, that Alise Sainte-Reine is the place where Vercingetorix capitulated. But even this error benefited science; some well directed excavations at Alaise brought many Roman remains to light, which were subsequently sent to enrich the museum at Besançon.

After 1871, his course of lectures on diplomatics having been given up, Quicherat, still professor of archaeology, was nominated director of the Ecole des Chartes. He filled this post with the same energy which he had shown in the many scientific commissions in which he had taken part. In 1878 he gave up his duties as professor, which then fell to the most conspicuous of his pupils, Robert de Lasteyrie.

After his death it was decided to bring out his hitherto unpublished papers; among these are some important fragments of his archaeological lectures, but his , with which he was occupied for many years, is missing.

Selected publications
 Procès de condamnation et de réhabilitation de Jeanne d'Arc, 5 vol., 1841-1849. Available online: tome I, tome II, tome III, tome IV, tome V.
 [https://archive.org/stream/aperusnouveaux00quic#page/n7/mode/2up Aperçus nouveaux sur l'histoire de Jeanne d'Arc], 1850
 Thomas Basin, 1855-1859 
 L'Alésia de César rendue à la Franche-Comté, 1857 
 Histoire de sainte Barbe, 1860-1864. Available online: tome I, tome II, tome III.
 De la formation française des anciens noms de lieu, 1867
 Histoire du costume en France, 1875
 Rodrigue de Villandrando. L'un des combattants pour l'indépendance française au quinzième siècle 1879
 posthumous collection : Mélanges d'archéologie et d'histoire (1885-1886), containing la Notice sur l’Album de Villard de Honnecourt architecte du XIIIe siècle (written in 1849)

References

1814 births
1882 deaths
Writers from Paris
French archaeologists
19th-century French historians
French medievalists
Lycée Louis-le-Grand alumni
École Nationale des Chartes alumni
Academic staff of the École Nationale des Chartes
Officiers of the Légion d'honneur